Justin Qiang (Tibetan: Jampa Rigzin, ; born 1 January 2001) is a Chinese baseball player. He became the first player from Tibet ever signed to a major league contract when he signed with the Boston Red Sox organization in 2018, playing that season with the Rookie-level Gulf Coast League Red Sox. He was released on January 31, 2020, becoming a free agent.

References

Tibetan sportspeople
People from Lhasa
Baseball catchers
Chinese expatriate baseball players in the United States
2001 births
Living people